Tinnikuru is a village in Viljandi Parish, Viljandi County, Estonia. Until the 2017 administrative reform of Estonian municipalities the village was located in Tarvastu Parish. As of the 2011 Estonia Census, the settlement's population was 89.

Tarvastu cemetery is located in Tinnikuru village.

References

Villages in Viljandi County